Duarte Daun e Lorena Cardoso Pinto (born 17 March 1982 in Lisbon) is a Portuguese rugby union footballer. He plays as a fly-half.

Before moving to France, he played for Agronomia in Portugal, where he won the National Championship title in 2006–2007. He played for Blagnac in the French Second Division, in 2007/08.

He had 45 caps for the Portugal national team, from 2003 to 2010, and scored a total of 107 points (2 tries, 17 conversions and 21 penalties). He was a member of the Portugal squad that went to the 2007 Rugby World Cup. He played in all four games, being the top scorer for his country, with 2 conversions and 3 penalties, 12 points in aggregate.

External links

1982 births
Living people
Portuguese rugby union players
Rugby union fly-halves
Portuguese expatriate rugby union players
Expatriate rugby union players in France
Portuguese expatriate sportspeople in France
Rugby union players from Lisbon
Portugal international rugby union players